Trần Thị Phương Thảo (born 15 January 1993) is a Vietnamese footballer who plays as a midfielder for Women's Championship club Hồ Chí Minh City I and the Vietnam women's national team.

References

1993 births
Living people
Women's association football midfielders
Vietnamese women's footballers
Vietnam women's international footballers
21st-century Vietnamese women